André Mayounga (born 2 November 1968) is a Central African Republic judoka. He competed in the men's middleweight event at the 1992 Summer Olympics.

References

1968 births
Living people
Central African Republic male judoka
Olympic judoka of the Central African Republic
Judoka at the 1992 Summer Olympics
Place of birth missing (living people)